Flatliner may refer to:

 A person whose brain or cardiac activity is measured as a flatline
 The Flatliner Band, a country band from Brighton, IL
 The Flatliners, a Canadian ska punk rock band
 Flat-Liner, Australian haunted heavy-rock band
 4-Methylthioamphetamine, a psychoactive drug
 Flatliners, a 1990 science fiction psychological horror film directed by Joel Schumacher
 Flatliners (2017 film), a 2017 remake of the 1990 film, directed by Niels Arden Oplev
 "Flatliner" (song), a song by Cole Swindell and Dierks Bentley
 Another name for the Reverse STO, a professional wrestling move
 Flatlinerz, a band

See also 
 Flatline (disambiguation)